Moghnar is a village in Hur Rural District, in the Central District of Faryab County, Kerman Province, Iran. At the 2006 census, its population was 28, in 7 families.

References 

Populated places in Faryab County